Uddjaure is a lake in Norrbotten County, Lappland, Sweden, adjacent to Lake Hornavan.

Lakes of Norrbotten County